Tebbe is a surname. Notable people with the surname include:

Frederick N. Tebbe (1935–1995), American chemists
Friedrich-Wilhelm Tebbe (born 1945) German conductor, singer and organist
Mark Tebbe (born 1961), Adjunct Professor of Entrepreneurship at the University of Chicago's Booth School of Business

See also
Tebbe's reagent, is the organometallic compound

References